Count Me Out might refer to:
 Count Me Out (1938 film), a 1938 Merrie Melodies animated short starring Egghead.
 Count Me Out (1997 film), a 1997 Icelandic film
 "Count Me Out" (song), a song by New Edition
 CountMeOut.ie, a website which assists Irish ex-Catholics to formally defect and apostatize from the Roman Catholic Church
 "Count Me Out" (CSI: Miami), an episode of CSI: Miami